Murder in Space is also the title of a 1955 science fiction novel by David V. Reed and a 2007 mystery novel by Sydney J. Bounds.

Murder in Space is a 1985 science fiction murder mystery television movie set in the near future. The crew of an international space mission are on the return leg from Mars to Earth when an explosion occurs on the craft Conestoga, shortly after a series of murders starts. The crew of the returning craft are forbidden to return until the murderer is caught.

On its initial worldwide premiere, the film was shown without the ending and a competition was set for the viewers to solve the mystery of who the murderer or murderers were. The conclusion of the film was shown several days later, with the contestants eliminated one by one until the winner correctly identified the killer or killers. The final 15 minutes of the film was shown at a later date when the mystery was solved with only two countries provided winners with the correct answer.

Conestoga crew

Other cast members

Other cast members were reporters, wives and husbands, mission control staff and additional Russian characters.

Prize money

 USA - $60,000
 UK - £10,000

Related Prizes

PRIMETIME magazine, the FIRST CHOICE*SUPERCHANNEL program guide, featured a pull-out entry form which allowed viewers to identify the four murdered characters, their nationalities and, bizarrely, “how murdered?”. It then asked the ultimate question – “Who Committed the Murders?”

Readers who correctly guessed the answer had the opportunity to win a trip on the Orient Express however no entries received were actually correct so instead the closest answer to who was the murderer was given a years free subscription to the magazine.

Accompanying book

A novel also called "Murder In Space", published by Penguin, was produced around the same time; the last page of the book was an entry form for the competition to solve the mystery.
It was written by "FX Woolf", a pen-name for Howard Engels and Janet Hamilton.

Murder in Space: The Solution

A television show, hosted in the UK by Anneka Rice and Roger Cook and broadcast in July 1985 on TV Channel ITV, featured members of the UK public who were close or knew who the murderer actually was, thus winning the £10,000 prize money. The solution was then shown in the final 15 minutes of the movie to reveal the answer.

External links

References

Films about astronauts
Canadian science fiction television films
English-language Canadian films
1980s mystery films
Films scored by Arthur B. Rubinstein
Films directed by Steven Hilliard Stern
1980s Canadian films